Dying to Go Home is a Portuguese movie released in 1996. It was directed by Carlos da Silva and George Sluizer, starring Diogo Infante (as Manuel Espírito Santo) and Maria d'Aires (as Júlia Espírito Santo). The story takes place in Portugal and the Netherlands. Three languages are used during the movie (Portuguese, Dutch and English).

Plot 
Manuel Espírito Santo (whose surname means Holy Spirit), a Portuguese immigrant in the Netherlands suffers an accident and dies. Now a ghost, he discovers that his soul cannot rest unless his body is buried in his home country. He also discovers that he can appear in living people's dreams and thereby talk with them. He appears in his sister's dream and asks her to go to Amsterdam in order to retrieve his body.

Trivia 
Portuguese comedian Herman José has a minor role as Vasco da Gama.

External links 
 

1990s Portuguese-language films
1996 films
1990s fantasy comedy films
1996 romantic comedy films
Films directed by George Sluizer
Portuguese romantic comedy films